Esmaltina is the largest Portuguese bicycle manufacturer and one of the five largest in Europe, founded in 1970 in Sangalhos. It has exported over 3 million bikes since its beginning mostly for Europe (Spain, France, United Kingdom) and Africa. It is one of the remaining manufacturers from the once thriving bike and motorbike industry in the Águeda region.

References

External links 

Manufacturing companies established in 1970
Portuguese companies established in 1970
Cycle manufacturers of Portugal
Portuguese brands